The 2010 South African Figure Skating Championships were held at the Kolonnade Pretoria in Pretoria from 12 through 13 October 2009. Skaters competed in the disciplines of men's and ladies' singles. Skaters competed at the senior, novice, pre-novice, and juvenile levels. There was also a junior ladies' competition.

Senior results

Men

Ladies

Junior results

Ladies

* Anette Lande of Norway finished 2nd place after the short program (23.36), free skating (39.02), and overall with a score of 62.38, but is not included with the results.

Novice results

Men

Ladies

Pre-novice results

Boys

Girls

Juvenile results

Boys

Girls

External links
 2010 South African Championships results

South African Figure Skating Championships, 2010
South African Figure Skating Championships
South African Figure Skating Championships, 2010